Andrew Keeling is a British politician who has served as Chief Executive of the Falkland Islands since 2021. He previously served as Chief Operating Officer of Leicester City Council.

Career
In September 2020, it was announced that Keeling had accepted an offer to be appointed Chief Executive of the Falkland Islands. He assumed this role in April 2021, succeeding Barry Rowland.

References

Date of birth missing (living people)
Living people
Chief Executives of the Falkland Islands
21st-century British politicians